Erase Me may refer to:

"Erase Me" (song), by Kid Cudi (2010)
Erase Me (album), by Underoath (2018)